The tunica media (New Latin "middle coat"), or media for short, is the middle tunica (layer) of an artery or vein. It lies between the tunica intima on the inside and the tunica externa on the outside.

Artery
Tunica media is made up of smooth muscle cells, elastic tissue and collagen. It lies between the tunica intima on the inside and the tunica externa on the outside.

The middle coat (tunica media) is distinguished from the inner (tunica intima) by its color and by the transverse arrangement of its fibers.
 In the smaller arteries it consists principally of smooth muscle fibers in fine bundles, arranged in lamellae and disposed circularly around the vessel. These lamellae vary in number according to the size of the vessel; the smallest arteries having only a single layer, and those slightly larger three or four layers - up to a maximum of six layers. It is to this coat that the thickness of the wall of the artery is mainly due.
 In the larger arteries, as the iliac, femoral, and carotid, elastic fibers and collagen unite to form lamellae which alternate with the layers of smooth muscular fibers; these lamellae are united to one another by elastic fibers which pass between the smooth muscular bundles, and are connected with the fenestrated membrane of the inner coat.
 In the largest arteries, as the aorta and brachiocephalic, the amount of elastic tissue is considerable; in these vessels a few bundles of white connective tissue also have been found in the middle coat. The muscle fiber cells are arranged in 5 to 7 layers of circular and longitudinal smooth muscle with about 50μ in length and contain well-marked, rod-shaped nuclei, which are often slightly curved.

Vein
The middle coat is composed of a thick layer of connective tissue with elastic fibers, intermixed, in some veins, with a transverse layer of muscular tissue.

The white fibrous element is in considerable excess, and the elastic fibers are in much smaller proportion in the veins than in the arteries.

Additional images

References

External links
  - "Bird, vessels (LM, High)"

Arteries